Söderberg is a common Swedish surname. Variations of the name include Soderberg and  Soderbergh.

Geographical distribution
As of 2014, 95.5% of all known bearers of the surname Söderberg were residents of Sweden (frequency 1:828) and 2.8% of Finland (1:15,705).

In Sweden, the frequency of the surname was higher than national average (1:828) in the following counties:
 1. Västernorrland County (1:305)
 2. Gotland County (1:406)
 3. Västmanland County (1:489)
 4. Södermanland County (1:547)
 5. Jämtland County (1:548)
 6. Uppsala County (1:574)
 7. Dalarna County (1:632)
 8. Norrbotten County (1:648)
 9. Gävleborg County (1:656)
 10. Örebro County (1:702)
 11. Kronoberg County (1:766)
 12. Västerbotten County (1:785)
 13. Stockholm County (1:787)
 14. Värmland County (1:793)

In Finland, the frequency of the surname was higher than national average (1:15,705) in the following regions:
 1. Åland (1:850)
 2. Ostrobothnia (1:3,104)
 3. Uusimaa (1:8,744)
 4. Satakunta (1:9,280)

Söderberg
Anders Söderberg (b. 1975), Swedish athlete in ice hockey 
Anna Söderberg (b. 1973), Swedish female athlete in discus throw
Bertil Söderberg, Swedish athlete in handball
Carl Söderberg, Swedish ice hockey player
David Söderberg (b. 1979), Finnish athlete in hammer throw
Dora Söderberg (1899-1990), Swedish actress
Eugénie Söderberg (1903-1973), German-born Swedish-American writer and journalist
Freddy Söderberg (b. 1984), Swedish athlete in football
Hjalmar Söderberg (1869 - 1941), Swedish novelist, playwright, poet and journalist
Inga-Britt Söderberg (1935-2019), Finnish model and former Miss Europe
Lennart Söderberg (b. 1941), Swedish athlete/manager in football
Johan Söderberg (b. 1962), Swedish film director
Johan Söderberg (b. 1973), Swedish musician
Tommy Söderberg (b. 1948), Swedish football coach
Torgny Söderberg (f. 1980s), Swedish songwriter 

Soderberg
Alicia M. Soderberg (b. 1977), United States astrophysicist
Brad Soderberg (b. 1962), United States basketball coach
Bryce Soderberg (b. 1980), Canadian musician
Carl R. Soderberg (1895-1979), United States electrical engineer
Chuck Soderberg (f. 2000s), United States politician
Lena Soderberg (born 1951), Swedish actress
Mary Soderberg (f. 2000s), United States female politician 
Nancy Soderberg (f. 1990s-2000s), United States foreign policy analyst
Peter H. Soderberg (f. 1970s-2000s), United States business manager

Soderbergh
Steven Soderbergh (b. 1963), United States film director

Söderborg
Berndt Söderborg (b. 1933), Swedish chess master

References

Swedish-language surnames